WCFL 104.7 FM is a Christian radio station licensed to Morris, Illinois and owned by the University of Northwestern – St. Paul.  WCFL airs a Christian adult contemporary music format, relaying the programming of 91.7 WBGL in Champaign, Illinois.

In a complaint filed with the Federal Communications Commission in 2017, WCFL claims that its signal has been subjected to co-channel interference from translator W284DA, which relays WRDZ. The translator is operated by Polnet Communications Ltd. of Chicago.

History
WCFL 104.7 originally held the call letters WRMI-FM, and was first licensed May 24, 1962. In the 1970s, WRMI-FM aired a MOR format. In 1977 the station's call sign was changed to WCSJ-FM. WCSJ-FM initially simulcast the MOR format of WCSJ 1550. By 1983, the station was airing a country music format, separate from its AM sister station. In 1988 the station changed its call letters to WUEZ-FM. As WUEZ-FM, the station aired an easy listening format. In 1990 the station changed is callsign to WCFL and adopted an Oldies format with the branding "Super CFL" using slogans and jingles which harkened back to WCFL AM 1000. The original WCFL-FM air staff included Gary Rivers, Bob Zak, Tom Kapsalis, Don Beno, and Jeff Andrews. WCFL played rock hits from 1965 to 1979, with the goal of capturing the sound of the original WCFL. The oldies format lasted until January 1994, when the station began simulcasting the soft AC programming of WCSJ 1550.

In late 1993, the station was sold to the Illinois District Council of the Assemblies of God. In February 1994, the station went silent while the sale was being finalized. WCFL adopted its present Contemporary Christian music format in May 1994. By 2003, the station was simulcasting WBGL full-time.

In August 2019, the Illinois Bible Institute reached an agreement to sell the entire WBGL/WCIC New Life Media Network (including WCFL) to the University of Northwestern – St. Paul, which owns and operates a network of contemporary Christian stations and a network of Christian talk and teaching stations, for $9,901,558.34.

Former Logo

References

External links
 91.7 WBGL - official website
 New Life Media network - sister station info
 

Assemblies of God
Contemporary Christian radio stations in the United States
1962 establishments in Illinois
Radio stations established in 1962
Pentecostalism in the United States
Northwestern Media
CFL (FM)